Pat Travers is the debut album by Canadian rock musician Pat Travers. It was released in 1976 on Polydor Records.

Track listing
All tracks composed by Pat Travers, except where indicated.

Side One
"Stop and Smile" - 3:51
"Feelin' Right" - 3:55
"Magnolia" (J. J. Cale) - 4:28
"Makes No Difference" - 4:30

Side Two
"Boom Boom (Out Goes the Lights)" (Stan Lewis) - 2:48
"Mabellene" (Chuck Berry, Russ Fratto, Alan Freed) - 2:56
"Hot Rod Lincoln" (Charlie Ryan, W. S. Stevenson) - 2:51 
"As My Life Flies" (Pat Travers, S. Travers) - 2:34
"Medley Parts 1 & 2" - 6:45

Personnel
Peter 'Mars' Cowling - bass
Roy Dyke - drums
Pat Travers - guitar, keyboard, vocals

Track 5
Drums – Mike Kellie
Keyboards – Brian Chatton
Written-By – Little Walter

Pat Travers albums
Polydor Records albums
1976 debut albums